Tsutomu "Jimmy" Mirikitani (June 15, 1920 – October 21, 2012) was an American artist notable as the subject of the 2006 documentary film The Cats of Mirikitani.

Biography
Mirikitani was born June 15, 1920, in Sacramento, California. By age 4, his family had moved to Hiroshima, Japan. He returned to the US shortly before the US entered World War II, and as a result he was sent to the Tule Lake internment camp. In the decades after the war, he worked a series of odd jobs until the early 1950s, when he wound up unemployed and homeless in New York City. Here he began producing brightly colored drawings with ballpoint pen or colored pencil and selling them in parks. When an art professor found him sleeping in the Columbia University library, he referred Mirikitani to the New York Buddhist Church, who provided him with housing. During this time, he obtained employment as a cook and met Jackson Pollock at a restaurant in Long Island. He eventually became a live-in cook for a wealthy benefactor living on Park Avenue, but when this person died in the late 1980s he again became homeless.

In 2001, he met filmmaker Linda Hattendorf, who purchased some of his art and began filming him. Eventually her content became the 2006 doucmentary film The Cats of Mirikitani, which outlines Mirikitani's life and covers his artwork. After the film's release, Mirikitani's first solo exhibition was organized by the Wing Luke Asian Museum of Seattle; it then traveled to the Asian/Pacific/American Institute at New York University, the University of North Texas, and Portland's Nikkei Legacy Center, among others. In 2010 his work was featured in an exhibit of Japanese American Internment Camp artwork at the Smithsonian's Renwick Gallery. In 2011, his work was featured at the Japanese Canadian National Museum.

References

Japanese-American internees
American artists of Japanese descent
Artists from Sacramento, California
Homeless people
1920 births
2012 deaths